Sakule is a village in Serbia. It is situated in the Opovo municipality, in the South Banat District, Vojvodina province. The village has a Serb ethnic majority (94,82%) and it has a population of 2,048 people (2002 census).

Historical population

1961: 2,725
1971: 2,525
1981: 2,280
1991: 2,200

See also
List of places in Serbia
List of cities, towns and villages in Vojvodina

References
Slobodan Ćurčić, Broj stanovnika Vojvodine, Novi Sad, 1996.
Todorov, Anita: Geografski prikaz Sakula, Diplomski pad, Novi Sad 2002.
Frank, Jozef: Sakule, 2009 (in Serbian).

Populated places in Serbian Banat
Populated places in South Banat District
Opovo